Song is a town and local government area in Adamawa State, Nigeria is a town and also a local government area in the state with the area council consisting districts of Song, Dumme, Dirma, Kilange, Funa, Gudu, Mboi, Kilange, Hirna, Gari, Waje, Suktu, Zumo, Waltandi and Ditera

Population 
The estimated population of Song is 260, 900

References 

Local Government Areas in Adamawa State